James Carson may refer to:
James H. Carson (1821–1853), Second Sergeant in the US Army in the mid-1850s
James Harvey Carson (1808–1884), Virginia politician and militia general (Confederate)
Captain James Carson, pseudonym used by the Stratemeyer Syndicate for the five volume "Saddle Boys" series
James Carson (American football) (1940–1999), head coach of Jackson State University
James Carson (physician) (1772–1843), Scottish physician
Jim Carson (musician) (1934–2008), New Zealand tuba player and military band leader
James Carson (rugby union) (1870–1903), Australian rugby union player
James Carson (water polo) (1901–1964), American Olympic water polo player
James S. Carson (1874–1960), American corporate executive and Spanish–American War veteran
James H. Carson Jr. (1935–2015), American lawyer
 Jimmy Carson (born 1968), American ice hockey player